This is a list of railway bridges and railway viaducts.

Africa
 Blue Nile Road and Railway Bridge, crossing the Blue Nile in Khartoum, Sudan
 El Ferdan Railway Bridge, crossing the Suez Canal near Ismailia, Egypt
 Kafue Railway Bridge, crossing the Kafue River at Kafue, Zambia

Asia
 Bukit Merah Lake Railway Bridge, crossing Bukit Merah Lake in Perak, Malaysia
 Ji'an Yalu River Border Railway Bridge, crossing the Yalu River between Ji'an, Jilin Province and Manp'o, Chagang Province, North Korea
 Rupsha Rail Bridge, crossing the Rupsha River in Khulna District, Bangladesh

China
 List of railway bridges and viaducts in Hong Kong
 Beipan River Shuibai Railway Bridge, crossing the Beipan River near Liupanshui, Guizhou province
 Fenglingdu Yellow River Railway Bridge, crossing the Yellow River between Shanxi and Shaanxi provinces
 Lancang River Railway Bridge, crossing the Lancang River near Baoshan, Yunnan province
 Luokou Yellow River Railway Bridge, crossing the Yellow River in Jinan, Shandong
 Najiehe Railway Bridge, crossing the Sancha River in Guizhou province
 Qinglong Railway Bridge, crossing the Beipan River in Qinglong County, Guizhou province
 Qingshuihe Railway Bridge, crossing the Quigshui River in Ghizhou province
 Tongjiang-Nizhneleninskoye railway bridge, crossing the Amur River between Nizhneleninskoye, Russia and Tongjiang, China
 Yachi Railway Bridge, crossing the Yachi River in Guiyang province

Yangtze River
 Anqing Yangtze River Railway Bridge, near Anqing, Anhui
 Baishatuo Yangtze River Railway Bridge, in Chongqing
 Changshou Yangtze River Railway Bridge, in Changshou District, Chongqing
 Hanjiatuo Yangtze River Bridge, in Fuling District, Chongqing
 Nanjing Yangtze River Bridge, in Nanjing, Jiangsu province
 Tianxingzhou Yangtze River Bridge, in Wuhan, Hubei Province 
 Wanzhou Railway Bridge, in Wanzhou District, Chongqing
 Wuhan Yangtze River Bridge, between Wuhan and Hubei provinces
 Yichang Yangtze River Railway Bridge, in Yichang, Chongqing

India
 Chenab Rail Bridge, crossing the Chenab River in the Reasi district, Jammu and Kashmir
 Naigaon railway bridge, crossing Vasia Creek in Maharashtra
 Nashipur Rail Bridge, crossing the Bhagirathi River in West Bengal
 Sevoke Railway Bridge, crossing the River Teesta at Sevoke, West Bengal
 Silver Jubilee Railway Bridge Bharuch, crossing the Narmada River in Gujarat
 Zuari Bridge, crossing the Zuari River in Goa

Russia
 Komsomolsky Railway Bridge, crossing the Ob River, in Novosibirsk
 Novosibirsk Rail Bridge, crossing the Ob River in Novosibirsk
 Rail Bridge over the Iset River, Kamensk-Uralsky, crossing the Iset River in Sverdlovsk oblast
 Tongjiang-Nizhneleninskoye railway bridge, crossing the Amur River between Nizhneleninskoye, Russia and Tongjiang, China

South Korea
 Dangsan Railway Bridge, crossing the Han River in Seoul
 Hangang Railway Bridge, crossing the Han River in Seoul
 Jamsil Railway Bridge, crossing the Han River in Seoul
 Magok Railway Bridge, crossing the Han River in Seoul

Thailand

 Chakri Railway bridge, crossing the Pa Sak River in Phra Nakhon Si Ayutthaya Province
 Guang River Railway bridge, crossing the Guang River near Lamphun
 Hanuman River Railway bridge, crossing the Hanuman River in Kabin Buri District, Prachinburi Province

Europe
 Athlone Railway Bridge, crossing the River Shannon at Athlone, Ireland
 Bolesławiec rail viaduct, crossing the Bóbr River in Lower Silesia, Poland
 Citadel Rail Bridge, crossing the Vistula River in Warsaw, Poland
 Eglisau railway bridge, crossing the Rhine in the canton of Zurich, Switzerland
 Finland Railway Bridge, crossing the Neva River in Saint Petersburg, Russia
 Gauja River Railway Bridge, crossing the Gauja River in Ūdriņi, Latvia
 High Speed Railway Bridge over AP7, Llinars del Valles, crossing the Mogent River in Llinars del Vallès, Catalonia, Spain
 Jänhijoki railway bridge, crossing the Jänhijoki River near Minkiö, Tavastia Proper, Finland
 Jonava railway bridge, crossing the Neris River in Jonava, Lithuania
 Jizera Railway Bridge, crossing the Jizera River between Kořenov and Tanvald, Czech Republic
 Jonava railway bridge, crossing the Neris in Jonava, Lithuania
 Kerch railway bridge, crossing the Kerch Strait between Krasnodar Krai, Russia and Crimea
 Koblenz Aare railway bridge, crossing the River Aare in Aargau canton, Switzerland
 Liffey Railway Bridge, crossing the River Liffey in Dublin, Ireland
 Limfjord Railway Bridge, crossing the Limfjord in North Jutland, Denmark
 Meschio Railway Bridge, crossing the Meschio River between Sacile and Ponte della Muda in Italy
 Moscow-Riga Railroad Bridge, crossing the Moscow Canal between Tushino and Shchukino Districts in northwestern Moscow, Russia
 New Railway Bridge, crossing the Sava river in Belgrade, Serbia
 Nijmegen railway bridge, crossing the River Waal in Nijmegen, Netherlands
 Northern Railway Bridge, crossing the Danube in Vienna, Austria
 Nyköping Railway Bridge, crossing the river Nyköpingsån in Nyköping, Sweden
 Old Railway Bridge, crossing the Sava river in Belgrade, Serbia
 Petrovskyi Railroad Bridge, crossing the Dnieper in Kyiv, Ukraine
 Railway Bridge, Kaunas, crossing the Nemunas River in Kaunas, Lithuania
 Railway Bridge, Riga, crossing the Daugava river in Riga, Latvia
 Road–Railway Bridge, Novi Sad, crossing the Danube in Novi Sad, Serbia
 Struve Railroad Bridge, crossing the Dnieper in Kyiv, Ukraine
 Torne River Railway Bridge, crossing the Torne River between Haparanda, Sweden and Tornio, Finland
 Vyšehrad railway bridge, crossing the Vltava River in Prague, Czech Republic

Germany
 Dömitz Railway Bridge, crossing the Elbe River near Dömitz
 Duisburg-Hochfeld Railway Bridge, crossing the Rhine in Duisburg
 Hamm Railway Bridge, crossing the Rhine in Düsseldorf
 Haus-Knipp railway bridge, crossing the Rhine in Duisburg
 Wesel Railway Bridge, crossing the Rhine at Wesel

United Kingdom

 Lagan Railway Bridge, crossing the River Lagan in Belfast, Northern Ireland

England
 Ballingham Railway Bridge, crossing the River Wye in Ballingham
 Chepstow Railway Bridge, crossing the River Wye between England and Wales
 Goole railway swing bridge, crossing the River Ouse near Goole
 Great Northern Railway Bridge Number 184, crossing the River Nene in Peterborough
 Lipwood Railway Bridge, crossing the South Tyne near Lipwood, Northumberland
 Monkwearmouth Railway Bridge, crossing the River Wear at Sunderland
 Railway Bridge (171c) Grand Union Canal, in Milton Keynes
 Ridley Railway Bridge, crossing the River South Tyne in Northumberland
 River Irwell Railway Bridge, crossing the River Irwell in Manchester
 Runcorn Railway Bridge, crossing the River Mersey in Cheshire
 Scarborough Railway Bridge, crossing the River Ouse in York
 Scotswood Railway Bridge, crossing the River Tyne in Tyneside
 Severn Railway Bridge, crossing the Severn Estuary in Gloucestershire
 Sheepwash Channel Railway Bridge, crossing Sheepwash Channel in Oxford
 Surtees Rail Bridge, crossing the River Tees in Stockton-on-Tees
 Warden Railway Bridge, crossing the River South Tyne in Northumberland
 Wylam Railway Bridge, crossing the River Tyne at Hagg Bank, Northumberland

River Thames

 Appleford Railway Bridge, near Appleford-on-Thames, Oxfordshire
 Barnes Railway Bridge, in London
 Battersea Railway Bridge, in London
 Black Potts Railway Bridge, in Windsor
 Blackfriars Railway Bridge, in London
 Bourne End Railway Bridge, in Bourne End
 Cannon Street Railway Bridge, in London
 Fulham Railway Bridge, in London
 Gatehampton Railway Bridge, in Lower Basildon
 Kennington Railway Bridge, in Kennington
 Kew Railway Bridge, in London
 Kingston Railway Bridge, in Kingston upon Thames
 Maidenhead Railway Bridge, between Maidenhead and Taplow
 Moulsford Railway Bridge, at Moulsford
 Nuneham Railway Bridge, near Abingdon, Oxfordshire
 Osney Rail Bridge, in Oxford
 Richmond Railway Bridge, in Richmond
 Shiplake Railway Bridge, at Wargrave
 Staines Railway Bridge, at Staines-upon-Thames
 Windsor Railway Bridge, in Windsor

Scotland
 Ballindalloch Railway Bridge, crossing the River Spey in Moray
 Banavie Railway Swing Bridge, crossing the Caledonian Canal at Banavie
 Caledonian Railway Bridge, crossing the River Clyde in Glasgow
 Dalmarnock Railway Bridge, crossing the River Clyde in Dalmarnock
 Tay Railway Bridge, crossing the Firth of Tay in Fife

Wales
 Chepstow Railway Bridge, crossing the River Wye between England and Wales
 Conwy Railway Bridge, crossing the River Conwy in Conwy
 St. Julian's railway bridge, crossing the River Usk near Newport
 Usk Railway Bridge, crossing the River Usk in Newport

North America

Canada
 Canadian Northern Railway Bridge (Prince Albert, Saskatchewan), crossing the North Saskatchewan River in Prince Albert, Saskatchewan
 CPR Bridge (Saskatoon), crossing the South Saskatchewan River in Saskatoon, Saskatchewan
 Fredericton Railway Bridge, crossing the Saint John River in Fredericton, New Brunswick
 Mission Railway Bridge, crossing the Fraser River between Mission and Abbotsford, British Columbia
 Prince George CNR Bridge, crossing the Fraser River at Prince George, British Columbia
 Red Deer Canadian Pacific Railway Bridge, crossing the Red Deer River in Red Deer, Alberta
 Reversing Falls Railway Bridge, crossing the Saint John River in Saint John, New Brunswick
 Saint Croix–Vanceboro Railway Bridge, crossing the St. Croix River between St. Croix, New Brunswick and Vanceboro, Maine
 Second Narrows Rail Bridge, crossing the Burrard Inlet between Vancouver and North Vancouver, British Columbia

Ontario
 Canadian Northern Ontario Railway Federal Bridge, crossing the Rideau River in Ottawa
 International Railway Bridge, crossing the Niagara River between Fort Erie, Ontario and Buffalo, New York
 Michigan Central Railway Bridge, crossing the Niagara Gorge between Niagara Falls, Ontario and Niagara Falls, New York
 Michigan Central Railway Cantilever Bridge, crossing the Niagara Gorge between Niagara Falls, New York, and Niagara Falls, Ontario
 Sault Ste. Marie International Railroad Bridge, crossing the St. Marys River between Sault Ste. Marie, Michigan and Sault Ste. Marie, Ontario

Quebec
 Bordeaux Railway Bridge, crossing the Rivière des Prairies between Montreal and Laval
 Laurier Railway Bridge, crossing the Rivière des Prairies in Montreal
 Pierre Le Gardeur Railway Bridge, crossing the Rivière des Prairies in Montreal
 Saint-Laurent Railway Bridge, crossing the Saint Lawrence River and Seaway between Montreal and Kahnawake

Mexico
 Eagle Pass Union Pacific International Railroad Bridge, crossing the Rio Grande between Eagle Pass, Texas and Piedras Negras, Coahuila
 Laredo International Railway Bridge 2, crossing the Rio Grande between Laredo, Texas, and Nuevo Laredo, Tamaulipas
 Laredo–Colombia International Railway Bridge 3, crossing the Rio Grande between Laredo, Texas, and Nuevo Laredo, Tamaulipas
 Texas Mexican Railway International Bridge, crossing the Rio Grande between Laredo, Texas, and Nuevo Laredo, Tamaulipas
 Union Pacific International Railroad Bridge (Eagle Pass–Piedras Negras), crossing the Rio Grande between Eagle Pass, Texas and Piedras Negras, Coahuila

United States
 Amtrak Railroad Anacostia Bridge, crossing the Anacostia River in Washington, D.C.
 Amtrak Susquehanna River Bridge, crossing the Susquehanna River between Havre de Grace and Perryville, Maryland
 Anacostia Railroad Bridge, crossing the Anacostia River in Washington, D.C.
 Apache Canyon Railroad Bridge, crossing Galisteo Creek in Santa Fe County, New Mexico 
 B & O Railroad Potomac River Crossing, crossing the Potomac River between Sandy Hook, Maryland and Harpers Ferry, West Virginia
 B & O Railroad Viaduct, crossing the Ohio River in Bellaire, Ohio
 Bahia Honda Rail Bridge, crossing the Bahia Honda Channel in the Florida Keys, Florida
 Big Black River Railroad Bridge, crossing the Big Black River between Warren and Hinds counties, Mississippi
 Black Point Railroad Bridge, crossing the Petaluma River in Black Point-Green Point, California
 Boston and Providence Railroad Bridge, crossing Ten Mile River in East Providence, Rhode Island
 East Shoreham Covered Railroad Bridge, crossing the Lemon Fair River near East Shoreham, Vermont
 Fairmont Railroad Bridge, crossing the Monongahela River near Fairmont, West Virginia
 First Flats Rail Bridge, crossing the Cuyahoga River in Cleveland, Ohio
 Fisher Covered Railroad Bridge, crossing the Lamoille River in Wolcott, Vermont
 Fort Sumner Railroad Bridge, crossing the Pecos River near Fort Sumner, New Mexico
 Gimlet Pegram Truss Railroad Bridge, crossing the Big Wood River in Blaine County, Idaho
 Harvey Railroad Bridge, crossing the Des Moines River east of Harvey, Iowa
 Hi-Line Railroad Bridge, crossing the Sheyenne River in Valley City, North Dakota
 Hunting Creek Railroad Bridge, crossing Hunting Creek at Morganton, North Carolina
 India Point Railroad Bridge, crossing the Seekonk River between Providence and East Providence, Rhode Island
 Kansas City Southern Railroad Bridge, Cross Bayou, crossing Cross Bayou in Shreveport, Louisiana
 Norfolk Southern Lake Pontchartrain Bridge, crossing Lake Pontchartrain in Louisiana
 Norfolk Southern Tennessee River Bridge, crossing the Tennessee River at Decatur, Alabama
 Omega Pond Railroad Bridge, crossing Omega Pond in East Providence, Rhode Island
 Pacific Electric Railroad Bridge crossing Torrance Boulevard in Torrance, California 
 Republican River Pegram Truss, crossing the Republican River near Concordia, Kansas
 Rosalia Railroad Bridge, crossing Pine Creek in Rosalia, Washington
 Saint Croix–Vanceboro Railway Bridge, crossing the St. Croix River between St. Croix, New Brunswick and Vanceboro, Maine
 Santa Fe Arroyo Seco Railroad Bridge, crossing the Arroyo Seco canyon in Highland Park, Los Angeles, California
 Seabrook Railroad Bridge, crossing the Industrial Canal in New Orleans, Louisiana
 Shirley Railroad Bridge, crossing the Little Red River in Shirley, Arkansas
 Swanton Covered Railroad Bridge, crossing the Missisquoi River in Swanton, Vermont
 Travis L. Castle Railroad Trestle, crossing the Kanawha River in Charleston, West Virginia
 Wabash Railroad Bridge, crossing the Des Moines River south of Pella, Iowa

Columbia River 
 Beverly Railroad Bridge, near Beverly, Washington
 Burlington Northern Railroad Bridge 9.6, between Portland, Oregon, and Vancouver, Washington
 Columbia River Railroad Bridge, between Portland, Oregon, and Vancouver, Washington
 Rock Island Railroad Bridge (Columbia River), at Rock Island, Washington

Delaware River 
 Delair Memorial Railroad Bridge, between Philadelphia, Pennsylvania and Pennsauken Township, New Jersey
 Lehigh Valley Railroad, Delaware River Bridge, between Easton, Pennsylvania and Phillipsburg, New Jersey
 Morrisville–Trenton Railroad Bridge, between Morrisville, Pennsylvania and Trenton, New Jersey
 West Trenton Railroad Bridge, between Bucks County, Pennsylvania and Mercer County, New Jersey

Mississippi River 
 Burlington Rail Bridge, between Burlington, Iowa and Gulfport, Illinois
 Clinton Railroad Bridge, between Clinton, Iowa and Fulton, Illinois
 Crescent Rail Bridge, between Davenport, Iowa and Rock Island, Illinois
 Dubuque Rail Bridge, between Dubuque, Iowa and East Dubuque, Illinois
 Keithsburg Rail Bridge, between Louisa County, Iowa and Keithsburg, Illinois
 Keokuk Rail Bridge, between Keokuk, Iowa and Hamilton, Illinois
 La Crosse Rail Bridge, between La Crescent, Minnesota and La Crosse, Wisconsin
 Louisiana Railroad Bridge, between Louisiana, Missouri and Pike County, Illinois
 Newport Rail Bridge, between Inver Grove Heights and St. Paul Park, Minnesota
 Northern Pacific Bridge Number 9, in Minneapolis, Minnesota
 Pile–Pontoon Railroad Bridge, between Marquette, Iowa and Prairie du Chien, Wisconsin
 Quincy Rail Bridge, between Quincy, Illinois and West Quincy, Missouri
 St. Paul Union Pacific Rail Bridge, between Saint Paul and South Saint Paul, Minnesota
 Winona Rail Bridge, between Winona, Minnesota and Winona Junction, Buffalo County, Wisconsin

Missouri River 
 Chicago and North Western Railroad Bridge, in Pierre, South Dakota
 Glasgow Railroad Bridge, between Howard and Saline counties, Missouri
 Illinois Central Missouri River Bridge, between Council Bluffs, Iowa and Omaha, Nebraska
 Pencoyd Railroad Bridge, in Kansas City, Missouri
 St. Joseph Union Pacific Bridge, between St. Joseph, Missouri, and Elwood, Kansas
 Sibley Railroad Bridge, between Jackson and Ray counties, Missouri

Ohio River 
 C&O Railroad Bridge, between Cincinnati, Ohio and Covington, Kentucky
 Cairo Rail Bridge, between Wickliffe, Kentucky and Cairo, Illinois
 East Liverpool Railroad Bridge, between Chester, West Virginia and East Liverpool, Ohio
 Wabash Bridge (Ohio River), between Mingo Junction, Ohio and Follansbee, West Virginia

Connecticut
 Amtrak Bascule Bridge No. 116.74, crossing the Niantic River between East Lyme and Waterford
 Blackledge River Railroad Bridge, crossing the Blackledge River in New London County
 Devon Railroad Bridge, crossing the Housatonic River between Milford and Stratford
 Farmington River Railroad Bridge, crossing the Farmington River in Windsor
 Housatonic River Railroad Bridge, crossing the Housatonic River between Milford and Stratford
 Mianus River Railroad Bridge, crossing the Mianus River in Greenwich
 Mystic River Railroad Bridge, crossing the Mystic River in Mystic
 Norwalk River Railroad Bridge, crossing the Norwalk River in Norwalk
 Pequonnock River Railroad Bridge, crossing the Pequonnock River in Bridgeport
 River Road Stone Arch Railroad Bridge, crossing River Road in Salmon River State Forest, Colchester
 Saugatuck River Railroad Bridge, crossing the Saugatuck River in Westport
 South Norwalk Railroad Bridge crossing Main and Washington Streets in South Norwalk

Connecticut River
 Connecticut River Railroad Bridge, between Lyme and Old Saybrook
 Hartford–East Hartford railroad bridge, between Hartford and East Hartford
 Middletown–Portland railroad bridge, in Middletown
 Warehouse Point railroad bridge, between Enfield and Suffield

Idaho
 Cold Springs Pegram Truss Railroad Bridge, crossing the Big Wood River near Ketchum
 Conant Creek Pegram Truss Railroad Bridge, crossing Conant Creek in Fremont County
 Gimlet Pegram Truss Railroad Bridge, crossing the Big Wood River in Blaine County
 Grace Pegram Truss Railroad Bridge, crossing the Bear River near Grace
 Ririe A Pegram Truss Railroad Bridge, crossing the Snake River near Ririe
 Ririe B Pegram Truss Railroad Bridge, crossing the Snake River flood channel north of Ririe
 St. Anthony Pegram Truss Railroad Bridge, crossing Henrys Fork in Fremont County

Illinois
 Canal Street railroad bridge, crossing the Chicago River in Chicago
 Chicago & North Western Railway Stone Arch Bridge, crossing South Kinnikinnick Creek near Roscoe
 Chicago, Milwaukee & St. Paul Railway, Bridge No. Z-2, crossing the North Branch Canal of the Chicago River in Chicago
 Illinois Central Stone Arch Railroad Bridges, crossing three streets in Dixon
 Kinnikinnick Creek Railway Bridge, crossing South Kinnikinnick Creek near Roscoe
 Kinzie Street railroad bridge, crossing the Chicago River in Chicago
 Lake Shore and Michigan Southern Railway, Bridge No. 6, crossing the Calumet River in Chicago
 North Avenue railroad bridge, crossing the North Branch Canal of the Chicago River in Chicago
 Ottawa Rail Bridge, crossing the Illinois River in Ottawa

Maryland
 B & O Railroad Potomac River Crossing, crossing the Potomac River between Sandy Hook, Maryland and Harpers Ferry, West Virginia
 Baltimore & Ohio Railroad Bridge, Antietam Creek, crossing Antietam Creek near Keedysville
 Bollman Truss Railroad Bridge, crossing the Little Patuxent River at Savage
 P.W. & B. Railroad Bridge, crossing the Susquehanna River between Havre de Grace and Perryville
 Thomas Viaduct, Baltimore & Ohio Railroad, crossing the Patapsco River between Relay and Elkridge, Maryland
 Tuscarora Creek railroad bridge, crossing Tuscarora Creek in Frederick County

Massachusetts
 Buzzards Bay Railroad Bridge, crossing the Cape Cod Canal in Bourne
 Canalside Rail Trail Bridge, crossing the Connecticut River between Deerfield and Montague
 Cape Cod Canal Railroad Bridge, crossing the Cape Cod Canal in Bourne
 Connecticut River railroad bridge (Northfield, Massachusetts), crossing the Connecticut River in Franklin County
 Deerfield–Montague railroad bridge, crossing the Connecticut River in Deerfield
 Grand Junction Railroad Bridge, crossing the Charles River in Boston
 Western Railroad Stone Arch Bridges, crossing the Westfield River in Hampden, Hampshire, and Berkshire counties

Michigan
 Derby Street-Grand Trunk Western Railroad Bridge, crossing under Derby Street in Birmingham
 Fort Street–Pleasant Street and Norfolk & Western Railroad Viaduct, crossing under two streets in Detroit
 Sault Ste. Marie International Railroad Bridge, crossing the St. Marys River between Sault Ste. Marie, Michigan and Sault Ste. Marie, Ontario
 Thomson Road–Air Line Railroad Bridge, crossing the Michigan Air Line Railroad in Howard Township
 Trowbridge Road-Grand Trunk Western Railroad Bridge, crossing under Trowbridge Road in Bloomfield Hills

New Hampshire
 Contoocook Railroad Bridge, crossing the Contoocook River in Contoocook
 Goffstown Covered Railroad Bridge, crossing the Piscataquog River in Goffstown
 Hillsborough Railroad Bridge, crossing the Contoocook River in Hillsborough
 Sulphite Railroad Bridge, crossing the Winnipesaukee River in Franklin

New Jersey
 Arthur Kill Railroad Bridge, crossing the Arthur Kill between Elizabethport, New Jersey and Staten Island, New York
 CRRNJ Passaic River Bridge, crossing the Passaic River between Newark and Kearny
 DB Draw (Erie Railroad), crossing the Hackensack River between Secaucus and Kearny
 Lehigh Valley Railroad Bridge, crossing Newark Bay between Newark and Bayonne
 WR Railroad Bridge, crossing the Passaic River between Newark and Kearny

New York
 Arthur Kill Railroad Bridge, crossing the Arthur Kill between Elizabethport, New Jersey and Staten Island, New York
 Delaware and Hudson Railroad Bridge (Clinton County, New York), crossing the Ausable River in Clinton County
 International Railway Bridge, crossing the Niagara River between Fort Erie, Ontario and Buffalo, New York
 Michigan Central Railway Bridge, crossing the Niagara Gorge between Niagara Falls, Ontario and Niagara Falls, New York
 Michigan Central Railway Cantilever Bridge, crossing the Niagara Gorge between Niagara Falls, New York, and Niagara Falls, Ontario
 New York Connecting Railroad Bridge, crossing the East River in New York City
 Poughkeepsie-Highland Railroad Bridge, crossing the Hudson River between Poughkeepsie and Highland

Oregon
 Burlington Northern Railroad Bridge 8.8, crossing North Portland Harbor in Portland
 Crooked River Railroad Bridge, crossing the Crooked River in Jefferson County
 Oregon Slough Railroad Bridge, crossing North Portland Harbor in Portland
 Oregon Trunk Rail Bridge, crossing the Columbia River between Wishram Washington and Celilo Village

Willamette River
 Burlington Northern Railroad Bridge 5.1, in Portland
 Chambers Covered Railroad Bridge, crossing the Coast Fork in Cottage Grove
 Lake Oswego Railroad Bridge, in Clackamas County
 Southern Pacific Railroad Bridge at Lake Oswego, in Clackamas County
 St. Johns Railroad Bridge, in Portland
 Union Pacific Railroad Bridge at Lake Oswego, in Clackamas County
 Union Street Railroad Bridge, in Salem
 Willamette River Railroad Bridge, in Portland
 Wilsonville railroad bridge, at Wilsonville

Pennsylvania
 Banning Railroad Bridge, crossing the Youghiogheny River in Perry Township
 Beaver River Railroad Bridge, crossing the Beaver River in New Brighton
 Deer Creek Bridge, Stewartstown Railroad, crossing Deer Creek in York County
 Delta Trestle Bridge, Maryland and Pennsylvania Railroad, crossing a ravine in York County
 Muddy Creek Bridge, Maryland and Pennsylvania Railroad, crossing Muddy Creek in Lower Chanceford and Peach Bottom Townships
 Ohio Connecting Railroad Bridge, crossing the Ohio River in Pittsburgh
 PC&Y Railroad Bridge, crossing the Ohio River in Allegheny County
 Pennsylvania Railroad Bridge over Shavers Creek, crossing Shavers Creek between Petersburg and Logan Township
 Pennsylvania Railroad Old Bridge over Standing Stone Creek, crossing Standing Stone Creek in Huntingdon
 Ridge Road Bridge, Stewartstown Railroad, crossing Ridge Road in York County
 Rochester-Beaver Railroad Bridge, crossing the Beaver River between Rochester and Bridgewater boroughs
 Scott Creek Bridge-North, Maryland and Pennsylvania Railroad, crossing Scott Creek in York County
 Stone Arch Road Bridge, Stewartstown Railroad, crossing Stone Arch Road in York County
 Valley Road Bridge, Stewartstown Railroad, crossing Valley Road in Hopewell Township

Allegheny River
 33rd Street Railroad Bridge, in Pittsburgh 
 Bessemer & Lake Erie Railroad Bridge, between Plum and Harmar Township
 Brilliant Branch Railroad Bridge, between Pittsburgh and Aspinwall
 Fort Wayne Railroad Bridge, in Pittsburgh
 Herr's Island Railroad Bridge, in Pittsburgh
 Oil City Pennsylvania Railroad Bridge, at Oil City
 West Penn Railroad Bridge, in Pittsburgh

Monongahela River
 Belle Vernon Railroad Bridge, between Speers and North Belle Vernon
 Glenwood B&O Railroad Bridge, in Pittsburgh
 McKeesport Connecting Railroad Bridge, between McKeesport and Duquesne
 Pittsburgh & Lake Erie Railroad Bridge at Munhall, between Munhall and Rankin
 Speers Railroad Bridge, between Speers and North Belle Vernon
 Union Railroad Clairton Bridge, between Clairton and Lincoln

Schulykill River
 B&O Railroad Bridge, in Philadelphia
 Columbia Railroad Bridge, in Philadelphia
 Connecting Railway Bridge, in Fairmount Park
 Falls Rail Bridge, in Fairmount Park
 New York Railroad Bridge, in Fairmount Park
 Pennsylvania Railroad, Connecting Railway Bridge, in Fairmount Park
 Philadelphia & Reading Railroad Bridge at West Falls, in Philadelphia
 Philadelphia & Reading Railroad Mule Bridge, in Philadelphia
 Philadelphia & Reading Railroad, Schuylkill River Viaduct, in Fairmount Park
 Philadelphia, Wilmington and Baltimore Railroad Bridge No. 1, in Philadelphia
 Reading Railroad Bridge, in Fairmount Park
 Schuylkill Arsenal Railroad Bridge, in Philadelphia

Susquehanna River
 Cumberland Valley Railroad Bridge, at Harrisburg
 Pennsylvania Railroad Bridge (Columbia, Pennsylvania), between Columbia and Wrightsville
 Philadelphia & Reading Railroad Bridge (Harrisburg, Pennsylvania), between Harrisburg and Cumberland County
 South Pennsylvania Railroad Bridge (Harrisburg, Pennsylvania), in Harrisburg

Virginia
 Belle Isle railroad bridge, crossing the James River in Richmond
 Oak Ridge Railroad Overpass, crossing under State Route 653 near Shipman
 Orange and Alexandria Railroad Bridge Piers, in Bull Run between Fairfax and Prince William counties
 Orange and Alexandria Railroad Hooff's Run Bridge, crossing Hooff's Run in Alexandria
 Richmond and Petersburg Railroad Bridge, crossing the James River in Richmond
 Valley Railroad Bridge, crossing the Gish Branch at Salem
 Valley Railroad Stone Bridge, crossing Folly Mills Creek in Augusta County

Oceania

Australia
 Fremantle Railway Bridge, crossing the Swan River in Fremantle, Western Australia
 Longford Railway Bridge, crossing the South Esk River, in Longford, Tasmania

New South Wales
 Argyle Street railway bridge, crossing Argyle Street in Moss Vale
 Bowenfels rail viaducts, crossing Farmers Creek in Bowenfels
 Bredbo River railway bridge, crossing the Bredbo River at Bredbo
 Burbong railway bridge, crossing the Molonglo River in Queanbeyan
 Burwood rail underbridge, crossing Burwood Road in Sydney
 Como railway bridge, crossing the Georges River in Sydney
 Coxs River railway bridges, crossing the Coxs River in Lithgow
 Hawkesbury River railway bridge, crossing the Hawkesbury River in New South Wales
 Ingalara Creek railway bridge, crossing Ingalara Creek at Michelago
 Lachlan River railway bridge, crossing the Lachlan River at Cowra
 Leycester Creek railway bridge, crossing Leycester Creek in Lismore
 Macdonald River railway bridge, Woolbrook, in Woolbrook
 Macleay River railway bridge, Kempsey, crossing the Macleay River in Kempsey Shire
 Macquarie River railway bridge, Bathurst, crossing the Macquarie River in Bathurst
 Macquarie River railway bridge, Dubbo, crossing the Macquarie River in Dubbo
 Manning River railway bridge, crossing the Manning River at Mount George
 Meadowbank Rail Bridge over Parramatta River, crossing the Parramatta River in Canada Bay
 Molonglo River railway bridge, crossing the Molonglo River in Queanbeyan
 Murray River railway bridge, Albury–Wodonga, crossing the Murray River between Albury and Wodonga
 Murray River road and railway bridge, Tocumwal, crossing the Murray River at Tocumwal
 Murrumbidgee River railway bridge, Gundagai, crossing the Murrumbidgee River in Gundagai
 Murrumbidgee River railway bridge, Narrandera, crossing the Murrumbidgee River in Narrandera Shire
 Murrumbidgee River railway bridge, Wagga Wagga, crossing the Murrumbidgee River in Wagga Wagga
 Nepean River railway bridge, Menangle, crossing the Nepean River in  Menangle
 Old Como railway bridge, crossing the Georges River between Como and Oatley
 Parramatta River railway bridge, Meadowbank, crossing the Parramatta River in Canada Bay
 Peel River railway bridge, Tamworth, crossing the Peel River in North Tamworth
 Queanbeyan River railway bridge, crossing the Queanbeyan River in Queanbeyan
 Severn River railway bridge, Dundee, crossing the Severn River at Dundee
 Tenterfield Creek railway bridge, Sunnyside, crossing Tenterfield Creek in Tenterfield Shire
 Wyaldra Creek railway bridge, Gulgong, crossing Wyaldra Creek at Gulgong
 Yarraford Rail Bridge over Beardy Waters, crossing Beardy Waters near Glen Innes
 Yass River railway bridge, Yass, crossing the Yass River at Yass

Queensland
 Alexandra Railway Bridge, crossing the Fitzroy River in Rockhampton
 Angellala Rail Bridge, crossing Angellala Creek in Sommariva
 Bremer River Rail Bridge, crossing the Bremer River in Ipswich
 Burnett railway bridge, crossing the Burnett River in Bundaberg
 Deep Creek Railway Bridge, crossing Deep Creek in Didcot
 Harlin Rail Bridge, crossing Ivory Creek at Harlin
 Humphery Railway Bridge, crossing a dry gully near Humphery
 Ideraway Creek Railway Bridge, crossing Ideraway Creek at Ideraway
 Imbil Railway Bridge, crossing Yabba Creek in Imbil
 Indooroopilly Railway Bridge, crossing the Brisbane River in Queensland
 Lockyer Creek Railway Bridge (Clarendon), crossing Lockyer Creek at Clarendon
 Lockyer Creek Railway Bridge (Lockyer), crossing Lockyer Creek at Lockyer
 Lockyer Creek Railway Bridge (Murphys Creek), crossing Lockyer Creek at Murphys Creek
 Sadliers Crossing Railway Bridge, crossing the Bremer River in Wulkuraka
 Saltwater Creek Railway Bridge, crossing Bundaberg Creek in Bundaberg
 Splitters Creek Railway Bridge, crossing Splitters Creek in Bundaberg Region
 Steep Rocky Creek Railway Bridge, crossing a dry wash near Ideraway
 Swansons Rail Bridge, crossing an unnamed gully in the Lockyer Valley Region

Victoria
 Cremorne Railway Bridge, crossing the Yarra River in Melbourne
 Hawthorn Railway Bridge, crossing the Yarra River in Melbourne
 Murray River railway bridge, Albury–Wodonga, crossing the Murray River between Albury and Wodonga
 Saltwater River Rail Bridge, crossing the Maribyrnong River in Melbourne

New Zealand
 Pomare Rail Bridge, crossing the Hutt River
 Silverstream Rail Bridge, crossing the Hutt River

South America
 Rollemberg–Vuolo Road–Railway Bridge, crossing the Parana River, between the states of São Paulo and Mato Grosso do Sul, Brazil

See also 
 List of railway bridges and viaducts in Hong Kong
 List of railway bridges and viaducts in Thailand
 List of railway bridges and viaducts in the United Kingdom
 B & O Bridge (disambiguation)
 CNR Bridge (disambiguation)
 CPR Bridge (disambiguation)
 International Railroad Bridge (disambiguation)
 Norfolk Southern Bridge (disambiguation)
 Pegram Truss Railroad Bridge (disambiguation)
 Pennsylvania Railroad Bridge (disambiguation)
 Rock Island Railroad Bridge (disambiguation)
 Union Pacific Bridge (disambiguation)
 Wabash Bridge (disambiguation)
 Rail bridge
 Railway viaduct

Transport lists
Lists of bridges